Megan Marie Mahoney (born February 13, 1983) is an American former professional basketball player. During her 14-year career, Mahoney won the Italian championship three times, in 2009, 2010 and 2012, and the Icelandic championship in 2006. In 2015, she won the EuroCup with ESB Villeneuve-d'Ascq. Mahoney was drafted by the Connecticut Sun in 2005 and played in the WNBA from 2006 to 2007.

High School & College
Mahoney attended Sturgis Brown High School in Sturgis, South Dakota.  As a senior, she was named Gatorade and USA Today South Dakota Player of the Year, High School Girls Athlete of the Year by the South Dakota Sports Writers Association, and Miss Basketball South Dakota. Mahoney also excelled academically, earning membership in the National Honor Society.

Mahoney attended Kansas State University and was a 2003 All Big-12 First Team selection. During her career, she set the all-time school record for assists (589), and she ranks second all-time in assist-to-turnover ratio (1.62).

Kansas State statistics

Source

Career
In the 2005 WNBA Draft, Mahoney was selected in the third round (34th overall) by the Connecticut Sun. A torn Achilles during the Big 12 championship game her senior season prevented her to play with the Sun during the 2005 season.

Mahoney signed with Haukar of the Icelandic Úrvalsdeild kvenna in January 2006, replacing KeKe Tardy. In 9 regular season games she averaged 27.9 points and 13.1 rebounds per game, helping the team achieve the best record in the league. In the playoffs, Mahoney averaged 28.3 points and 14.3 rebounds. In the finals she broke Penny Peppas scoring record by averaging 32.0 points and helped Haukar to a three-game sweep of Keflavík. For her effort she was named the Úrvalsdeild Playoffs MVP and the Úrvalsdeild Foreign Player of the Year.

In February 2006, she signed a three-year contract with the Connecticut Sun. During her first season (2006), Mahoney appeared in 31 games, starting once, and averaged 11.7 minutes per game.

On March 6, 2008, the Connecticut Sun traded Mahoney to the Houston Comets in exchange for Barbara Turner. On April 29, 2008, Mahoney was waived by the Comets.

In 2006 and in 2007 Megan played in Italy with Parma and next year she started to play with Cras Basket Taranto and she won Italian title in 2008/2009 2009/2010 (mvp of the finals) 2011/2012

In 2010–2011 during the Eurolegue Women Mahoney was called in the "rest of World" team against the Representative of Europe. She did 8 points in 5 minutes.

Between 2014 and 2016, Mahoney played in France for ESB Villeneuve-d'Ascq. She won the EuroCup Women 2015 and was runner-up the following season, and also came second in the 2014–15 Ligue Féminine de Basketball.

Mahoney signed with San Martino di Lupari of the Italian Serie A1. On January 15, 2017, she tore her anterior cruciate ligament of the right knee and missed the rest of the season. In May, 2017, Mahoney re-signed with San Martion for the 2017–2018 season.

She had planned to play the 2018–2019 season in Belgium but tore a tendon in her foot prior to the start of the season. The injury required a surgery and six to eight months of rehabbing. In June 2019, Mahoney announced her retirement from basketball.

Titles and awards

Titles
 EuroCup Women: 2015.
 Italian Champion: 2009, 2010, 2012
 Icelandic champion: 2006

Awards
 Serie A1 Finals MVP: 2010
 Úrvalsdeild Foreign Player of the Year: 2006
 Úrvalsdeild Playoffs MVP: 2006
 Icelandic All-Star MVP: 2009

References

External links
Megan Mahoney at wnba.com
WNBA stats at basketball-reference.com
FIBA profile at fibaeurope.com
Profile at EuroBasket.com

1983 births
Living people
American expatriate basketball people in France
American expatriate basketball people in Iceland
American expatriate basketball people in Italy
American women's basketball players
Basketball players from South Dakota
Connecticut Sun draft picks
Forwards (basketball)
Haukar women's basketball players
Houston Comets players
Kansas State Wildcats women's basketball players
People from Sturgis, South Dakota
Úrvalsdeild kvenna basketball players